Events in the year 2021 in Bulgaria.

Incumbents 
 President: Rumen Radev
 Prime Minister: Boyko Borisov (until 12 May), Stefan Yanev (from 12 May until 13 December), Kiril Petkov (from 13 December)

Events 
Ongoing – COVID-19 pandemic in Bulgaria

March
 22 March – Two Russian diplomats were declared persona non grata and expelled after being implicated in a GRU spy ring.

July 
30 July – Caretaker Health Minister Stoicho Katsarov announced that the government would impose stricter restrictions until August 31 following a surge in COVID-19 cases.

September
 7 September – The government imposed new COVID-19 restrictions after a rapid surge in COVID-19 infections.
 8 September – Thousands of people went to the streets in Sofia to protest the government's decision of imposing stricter COVID-19 restrictions.

November 
14 November – General elections were held in the country to elect both the President and the National Assembly.
23 November – A Macedonian bus carrying 52 people crashed and caught fire on the Struma motorway near the village of Bosnek, south-west of Sofia, killing 45 people, including twelve children. It was the deadliest road accident in Bulgarian history and was referred to as the deadliest bus crash in Europe in a decade.

Deaths 
6 January – Filip Trifonov, actor (b. 1947).
26 January – Georgi Ananiev, politician and former Minister of Defence (b. 1950).
6 May – Vanya Kostova, singer (b. 1957).
8 May – Georgi Dimitrov, footballer (b. 1959).
27 May – Lorina Kamburova, actress (b. 1991).
Tinka Dineva
Gergana Kofardzhieva
Klara Marinova
Denis Teofikov
Georgi Penkov
Petio Petkov
Angel

See also 
 List of years in Bulgaria
 2021 in Bulgaria
 2021 in Bulgarian sport

References 

 
Bulgaria
Bulgaria
2020s in Bulgaria
Years of the 21st century in Bulgaria